Sharda Mehta (26 June 1882 – 13 November 1970) was an Indian social worker, proponent of women's education, and a Gujarati writer. Born to a family of social reformers, she was one of the first two women graduates in the modern-day Gujarat state of India. She established institutes for women's education and women's welfare. She wrote several essays and an autobiography as well as translated some works.

Early life and family

Sharda Mehta was born on 26 June 1882 in Ahmedabad. She was the daughter of a judicial officer, Gopilal Manilal Dhruva, and Balaben; a Nagar Brahmin family. She was a maternal great-granddaughter of Bholanath Divetia, a social reformer and poet.

She received her primary education at Raibahadur Maganbhai Girl's High School. She later joined Anglo-vernacular classes at the Mahalakshmi Teachers Training College and matriculated in 1897. She received her Bachelor of Arts in Logic and Moral Philosophy in 1901 from Gujarat College. She and her elder sister Vidyagauri Nilkanth were the first two women graduates in Gujarat.

She married Sumant Mehta in 1898. He was a medical student then and four years her senior. He later served as a personal doctor of Gaekwads of Baroda State and as a social worker.

Career

Social work 
Mehta worked for social reforms and supported education, women's empowerment, opposition of caste restrictions, untouchability eradication, and Indian independence. She was influenced by Mahatma Gandhi. From 1906, she promoted swadeshi (domestic) goods and khadi clothes. She organised a protest against indentured servitude (Girmitiya) in 1917. She helped Indulal Yagnik in editing Navjivan in 1919.

She participated in the Gujarat Kisan Parishad (Gujarat Farmer's Conference) held in Ahmedabad in 1928. She met the Governor of Bombay as a member of the deputation for a settlement of the Bardoli Satyagraha. In 1929, she presented in front of the Royal Commission on Labour regarding labour conditions in textile mills in Ahmedabad. She picketed in front of the liquor shops during the civil disobedience movement in 1930. In 1931, she established a khadi store and worked at her husband's ashram near Shertha, Ahmedabad. In 1934, she established a co-operative store called .

Mehta was associated with several educational and women's welfare institutes in Ahmedabad, Baroda, and Bombay during these years, as well as being a member of Baroda Praja Mandal (Baroda People's Association). She was a member of the Ahmedabad Municipality from 1931 to 1935. In 1934, she established the Jyoti Sangh for women's welfare.

She was a proponent of women's education. She established the Vanita Vishram Mahila Vidyalaya in Ahmedabad. She also established a college affiliated with SNDT (Karve) Women's University.

Literary career 
Mehta had studied and was deeply influenced by Hindu texts, Sanskrit literature, and the works of Aurobindo, Sukhlal Sanghvi, and Sarvepalli Radhakrishnan.

She was an essayist, biographer, and translator. She wrote essays on social issues in dailies and magazines. Puranoni Balbodhak Vartao (1906) is a collection of children's stories aimed at their development. She wrote Florence Nightingale Nu Jeevancharitra (1906), a biography of English social reformer Florence Nightingale. She also wrote Grihavyavasthashastra (1920). Balakonu Gruhshikshan (1922) is a work on child education.

In 1938, she wrote her autobiography, about her public life and her efforts for women's education in Jeevansambharana (Reminiscences: The Memoirs of Shardaben Mehta). This work covers the period from 1882 to 1937 and includes the social, historical, and political situation and awakening of women.

With her sister, Mehta translated Romesh Chunder Dutt's Bengali novel Sansar (The Lake of Palms, 1902) as Sudhahasini (1907) and The Maharani of Baroda (Chimnabai II)'s Position of Women in Indian Life (1911) as Hindustanma Streeonu Samajik Sthan or Hindustanna Samajik Jeevanma Streenu Sthan (1915). She also translated Sathe Annabhau's novel as Varnane Kanthe.

Death 
She died on 13 November 1970 at Vallabh Vidyanagar.

Bibliography

See also 
 List of Gujarati-language writers

Notes and references

Notes

References

1882 births
1970 deaths
Women writers from Gujarat
19th-century Indian women writers
19th-century Indian writers
Indian social reformers
20th-century Indian women writers
20th-century Indian writers
Writers from Ahmedabad
Indian women activists
Indian biographers
Indian women non-fiction writers
Indian translators
Indian social workers
Indian autobiographers
Indian essayists
Indian children's writers
Women's education in India
19th-century translators
Indian independence activists from Gujarat
Gandhians
Mehta family
20th-century translators
20th-century women educators
Writers in British India